Geoncheon-eup is an eup or a town in the subdivision of the Gyeongju City, North Gyeongsang province, South Korea. Its 90.46 square kilometers are home to about 10,844 people. This population is served by three elementary schools, and one joint middle-high school.

Administrative divisions
Geoncheon-ri (건천리)
Geumcheok-ri (금척리)
Daegok-ri (대곡리)
Moryang-ri (모량리)
Bangnae-ri (방내리)
Seungseon-ri (승선리)
Sinpyeong-ri (신평리)
Yongmyeong-ri (용명리)
Jojeon-ri (조전리)
Cheonpo-ri (천포리)
Hwacheon-ri (화천리)

See also
Subdivisions of Gyeongju
Administrative divisions of South Korea

References

External links
 The official site of the Geoncheon-eup office

Subdivisions of Gyeongju
Towns and townships in North Gyeongsang Province